Ineko Arima (有馬稲子, Arima Ineko) is a Japanese film actress born on 3 April 1932 in Osaka. She is known for her work with director Yasujirō Ozu.

Selected filmography

Film

Television

Honours
Medal with Purple Ribbon (1995)
Order of the Precious Crown, 4th Class, Wisteria (2003)

References

External links

 

Japanese film actresses
Living people
20th-century Japanese actresses
Actresses from Osaka Prefecture
People from Ikeda, Osaka
1932 births
Recipients of the Medal with Purple Ribbon